Moldova competed at the 2020 Winter Youth Olympics in Lausanne, Switzerland from 9 to 22 January 2020.

Biathlon

Boys

Girls

Luge

Boys

Girls

Mixed team relay

See also
Moldova at the 2020 Summer Olympics

References

Nations at the 2020 Winter Youth Olympics

2020 in Moldovan sport
Moldova at the Youth Olympics